Andrew Durbin is an American poet, novelist, and editor. As of 2019, he has served as editor-in-chief of Frieze magazine. Prior to his position at Frieze, he co-founded Company Gallery, served as the Talks Curator at the Poetry Project, and served as a co-editor at Wonder press. Durbin is the author of two novels books and several chapbooks. He lives and works in London.

Early life and education 
Durbin was born in Orlando, Florida and raised in South Carolina. He moved to New York in 2008 and studied poetry and classics at Bard College. He graduated in 2011 and subsequently moved to New York City.

Work 
Upon arrival to New York, Durbin worked at the Bureau of General Services–Queer Division, curating the Queer Division's reading series. Durbin then went on work at the Poetry Project and served as their Talks Curator. He regularly attends and speaks at poetry readings in New York. Durbin and poet Ben Fama began a series of nightlife parties called Crush Parties. Upon invitation to the parties, guests were instructed to email the hosts names of their crushes which prompted a second-wave of invitations sent out to the crushes. Simultaneously, Durbin began collaborating with Ben Fama and Trisha Low on a small, independent press called Wonder. Wonder has published books, pamphlets, and limited edition art prints from writers and visual artists such as Kate Durbin, Kevin Killian, Juliana Huxtable, Ariana Reines, and Jacolby Satterwhite.

In 2015, a poem titled, "You've Been Flirting Again," was included in Frank Ocean's zine Boys Don't Cry which accompanied the release of Ocean's second studio album, Blonde.

Durbin has written for numerous print and digital art publications including artforum, BOMB, Texte zur Kunst, and Triple Canopy. He has written art criticism on a number of poets and visual artists including Bernadette Meyer, Robert Glück, Greer Lankton, and Robert Longo.

Durbin moderated the Open Score 2016 panel Generation You presented by New Museum and Rhizome. Panelists included Jacob Ciocci, Simon Denny, Juliana Huxtable, and Cathy Park Hong.

Editorial 
In early November 2017, ARTnews announced that Durbin has been named Senior Editor for the Americas at Frieze Magazine. In 2019, Durbin was named editor-in-chief of Frieze.

Durbin edited Kevin Killian’s Fascination: Memoirs (Semiotexte, 2018) as well as the chapbook series, Say bye to reason and hi to everything (Capricious, 2015).

MacArthur Park 

In September 2017, Durbin released his first full-length novel, titled MacArthur Park. The book takes its name from a Donna Summer cover of the song MacArthur Park, originally sung by Richard Harris and written/composed by Jimmy Webb. The book's plot loosely follows a fictional poet and art writer living in New York during and after the landfall of Hurricane Sandy in New York City in 2012. Writer Lynne Tillman says of MacArthur Park, "It’s wry, dramatic, cool, knowing, funny, sobering, a novel of unsparing consciousness that spars with the news and effects of uncontrollable weather. Durbin registers the temperature of our nights and days, with perfect pitch conversations and commentaries on pop culture, utopian collectives, the art world, politics, sex, emotions." The book is dedicated to artists Jacolby Satterwhite and Stewart Uoo.

Skyland 
Durbin's second book of fiction, Skyland, is an "impressionistic novella" that follows a writer on the island of Patmos with his close friend, a character based on the poet Shiv Kotecha. Both protagonists attempt to locate a painting made by the French novelist and photographer Hervé Guibert. 

According to Publishers Marketplace's website, Durbin is working on a biography of Peter Hujar and Paul Thek.

Themes 
Style

Durbin writes with, "aesthetic disinterest, waning faith, and terminal irony," notes poet Trisha Low. His poems often read as prose and wind up self-consciously adopting many voices, forms, and styles of "non-poetic" writing.

Influences

Durbin has cited a range of influences, such as the New Narrative movement of poetry with writers like Gary Indiana, Bob Glück, Bruce Boone, and Dodie Bellamy; Conceptual writer Robert Fitterman; the work of Language writers Lyn Hejinian and Leslie Scalapino; and writers Chris Kraus, Kathy Acker, and Lynne Tillman. He also cites Eileen Myles' The Importance of Being Iceland as a foundational text for fusing his art writing and poetry with his personal life.

Selected bibliography 

 Mature Themes (Nightboat Books, 2014).   ISBN 9781937658236 
 MacArthur Park (Nightboat Books, 2017). OCLC 982090502
 Skyland (Nightboat Books, 2020). ISBN  9781643620275
 Speed of Life (Farrar, Straus and Giroux, 2025).

References

External links 
 Writer's website
 Wonder Press

Panels and performances 
 Open Score 2016: Intro + Panel 1: Generation You, presented by New Museum and Rhizome
 POETRY WILL BE MADE BY ALL! – 89plus After Babel Stockholm Sessions, 2015
 Read the Room: A Poetry Reading, Art Basel, 2015
 Andrew Durbin reads "Track Star" and "You Are My Ducati," Westbrau Exhibition Space, Zurich, Switzerland , 2014

Year of birth missing (living people)
Living people
American editors
American male poets
American male novelists
Bard College alumni